Nulli Novikkathe is a 1985 Indian Malayalam-language film, directed by Mohan Roop and produced by Basheer Palakkad. The film stars Balan K. Nair, Madhuri, Sabitha Anand and Shivaji in the lead roles. The film has musical score by Rajamani.

Cast
Balan K. Nair
Madhuri
Sabitha Anand
Shivaji
T. G. Ravi
Roshni

Soundtrack
The music was composed by Rajamani with lyrics by Poovachal Khader and Vadakkumthara Ramachandran.

References

External links
 

1985 films
1980s Malayalam-language films